Michael Arthur Holland (March 12, 1956 – November 29, 2021) was an American professional golfer who played on the PGA Tour and the Nationwide Tour.

Early life and amateur career
Holland was born, raised and lived in Bishopville, South Carolina. He attended the University of South Carolina and was a member of the golf team, an All-American his senior year.

Professional career
Holland turned professional in 1978. He had a handful of top-10 finishes in PGA Tour events. He won a share of the 1981 Walt Disney World National Team Championship with playing partner Vance Heafner. A year later he finished a solo 2nd in the Danny Thomas Memphis Classic losing by six strokes to Raymond Floyd. His best finish in a major was T29 at the 1982 PGA Championship.

Professional wins (3)

PGA Tour wins (1)

Ben Hogan Tour wins (1)

Other wins (1)
1976 South Carolina Open (as an amateur)

See also
Spring 1980 PGA Tour Qualifying School graduates

References

External links

American male golfers
South Carolina Gamecocks men's golfers
PGA Tour golfers
Golfers from South Carolina
People from Bishopville, South Carolina
1956 births
2021 deaths